Arefabad (also Romanized as ‘Ārefābād; also known as Kalāteh-ye ‘Abd ol Reẕā) is a village in Rezqabad Rural District, in the Farah Dasht District of Kashmar County, Razavi Khorasan Province, Iran. At the 2006 census, its population was 2,016, in 514 families.

See also 

 List of cities, towns and villages in Razavi Khorasan Province

References 

Populated places in Kashmar County